The 2021 Hong Kong Women's Premier League is the inaugural edition of the Hong Kong Women's Twenty20 Premier League, the top level professional women's Twenty20 cricket league in Hong Kong, organised by the Cricket Hong Kong. The three-match tournament is being held between 19 May to 20 June 2021.

On 11 May 2021, the Cricket Hong Kong announced the fixtures of the league, with all the three matches being competed between two teams at the Tin Kwong Road Recreation Ground. Cricket Hong Kong originally organised the tournament with an aim to give the Hong Kong's top women cricketers a chance to participate in a competitive tournament at highest level.  

The squads of the franchise league were announced by Cricket Hong Kong via a tweet on 17 May 2021, with Jasmine Titmuss and Kary Chan named as the captain of the Jade Jets and the Bauhinia Stars respectively. All the matches are being live streamed on Cricket Hong Kong's YouTube channel and Facebook page.

Squads

Fixtures

1st T20

2nd T20

3rd T20

References

External links 

 Series home at CricketArchive

Hong Kong domestic cricket competitions
Women's Twenty20 cricket competitions
Sports leagues in Hong Kong
Cricket in Hong Kong
Domestic cricket competitions in 2021
2021 in Hong Kong cricket